Amari is both a surname and given name. Notable people with the name include:

Surname
, Japanese politician
, Japanese samurai of the Sengoku period
, Japanese samurai of the Sengoku period
Carl Amari (born 1963), American actor, director, producer and nationally syndicated radio host
John Amari (born 1948), American politician and judge
Michele Amari (1806–1889), Italian patriot and historian
Raja Amari (born 1971), Tunisian film director
Samai Amari (born 1980), Indonesian professional racing cyclist
, Japanese scholar

Given name
Amari Bailey (born 2004), American basketball player
Amari Cooper (born 1994), American football player
Amari Morgan-Smith (born 1989), English footballer
Amari Saifi (born c. 1956), leader of the Islamist militia
Amari Spievey (born 1988), American football safety

See also

Japanese-language surnames